Tell Beshara is an archaeological site 120m southwest of Tell Hazzine in the Beqaa Mohafazat (Governorate). It dates at least to the Middle Bronze Age.

References

Baalbek District
Bronze Age sites in Lebanon